Hasanabad (also Romanized as Ḩasanābād) is a village in Kuh Shah Rural District, Ahmadi District, Hajjiabad County, Hormozgan Province, Iran. At the 2006 census, its population was 136, in 29 families.

References 

Populated places in Hajjiabad County